The 2018 Monza FIA Formula 2 round was a pair of motor races held on 1 and 2 September 2018 at the Autodromo Nazionale Monza in Monza, Italy as part of the FIA Formula 2 Championship. It was the tenth round of the 2018 FIA Formula 2 Championship and was run in support of the 2018 Italian Grand Prix.

Classifications

Qualifying

Notes

– Antonio Fuoco received a 3-place grid penalty.

Feature Race 

 Notes
 – Sérgio Sette Câmara suffered problems and started from the pit lane.
 – Antonio Fuoco was disqualified for having used a non-compliant throttle map at the race start.
 – Sérgio Sette Câmara set the fastest lap but began the race from the pit lane, the two bonus points for fastest lap went to Artem Markelov as he set the fastest lap inside the top 10 finishers.

Sprint Race

Championship standings after the round

Drivers' Championship standings

Teams' Championship standings

References

External links 
 

Monza
Formula 2
Formula 2